The 2015 Newfoundland and Labrador general election, held on November 30, 2015, elected members of the 48th General Assembly of Newfoundland and Labrador. The Progressive Conservative Party which had governed since 2003 election, was defeated by the Liberal Party, which won a majority in the new assembly.

The election had been scheduled for October 13, 2015, under Newfoundland and Labrador's House of Assembly Act, mandating a fixed election day on the second Tuesday in October in the fourth calendar year after the previous election. However, the House of Assembly amended the act in June 2015, to delay the election until November 30, 2015, so that the election campaign would not overlap with the federal election scheduled on October 19, 2015.

Following the result of the election no party with the word "Conservative" in its name formed the government in either a provincial or federal jurisdiction in Canada for the first time since 1943.

At the time --with 55.2% of eligible voters casting a ballot -- this election had the lowest turnout of any provincial election since confederation.
This record was broken in 2021 when only 48.24% of eligible voters cast a ballot.

Party leadership
Following the 2011 provincial election Liberal leader Kevin Aylward announced his resignation as leader. Aylward was unable to win a seat in the legislature and announced on October 26, 2011, he would step down once his successor was chosen. On December 15, 2011, the Liberal Party announced that Dwight Ball would become Leader of the Opposition and interim Liberal leader effective January 3, 2012. Party president Judy Morrow announced in December 2011, that the party was not likely to hold a leadership convention until sometime in 2013. On November 17, 2013 Dwight Ball was elected leader of the Liberal Party.

On January 22, 2014, Kathy Dunderdale announced she was resigning as Premier of Newfoundland and Labrador and leader of the Progressive Conservative Party (PC Party) later that week and that Finance Minister Tom Marshall would replace her until the party selected a new leader. On January 24, 2014, Marshall was sworn in as the province's 11th premier. Marshall had indicated that he would not be seeking re-election as the member of the House of Assembly for Humber East and therefore would not contest the leadership of the Progressive Conservative Party. The party held its leadership convention on September 13, 2014 and chose Paul Davis as its leader. Davis was sworn in as the 12th Premier on September 26, 2014.

Timeline
2011
October 11, 2011: Election held for members of the Newfoundland and Labrador House of Assembly in the 47th General Assembly of Newfoundland and Labrador.
October 26, 2011: Liberal Leader Kevin Aylward announces his resignation after failing to win the district of St. George's-Stephenville East in the election.
December 15, 2011: The Liberal Party announces that Humber Valley MHA Dwight Ball will become Leader of the Opposition and interim Liberal leader effective January 3, 2012.
2012
January 3, 2012: Dwight Ball becomes interim leader of the Liberal Party of Newfoundland and Labrador.
September 13, 2012: Progressive Conservative MHA Tom Osborne announces that he has left the party and will sit as an independent.
2013
April 8, 2013: Yvonne Jones (Liberal) resigns her Cartwright-L'Anse au Clair seat to run in a federal by-election in Labrador.
 June 25, 2013: Lisa Dempster (Liberal) is elected MHA for Cartwright-L'Anse au Clair, following the resignation of Yvonne Jones.
July 18, 2013: Bay of Islands MHA Eddie Joyce is named Leader of the Opposition and Interim Liberal Leader replacing Dwight Ball who resigned to run for the leadership permanently in the party's 2013 leadership election.
August 29, 2013: Independent MHA Tom Osborne (former PC) joins the Liberal caucus.
October 2, 2013: Jerome Kennedy (PC) resigns his Carbonear-Harbour Grace seat.
October 21, 2013: The media reports that NDP Leader Lorraine Michael received a letter signed by all four members of her caucus over the previous weekend calling for a leadership election to be held in 2014. Michael subsequently asks the party to hold a leadership review in 2014 in which her leadership would be voted on, but not a full party convention. 
October 29, 2013: NDP MHAs Dale Kirby and Christopher Mitchelmore announce that they have left the NDP caucus and will sit as independents.
November 17, 2013: Dwight Ball is elected as leader of the Liberal Party.
November 26, 2013: Liberal Sam Slade is elected MHA for Carbonear-Harbour Grace.
2014
January 20, 2014: PC MHA Paul Lane for Mount Pearl South crosses the floor to the Liberal Party.
January 24, 2014: Kathy Dunderdale resigns as Premier. Finance Minister Tom Marshall is sworn in as premier until Dunderdale's successor is chosen.
January 27, 2014: Dale Kirby and Christopher Mitchelmore resign their NDP memberships and are now full Independents.
February 4, 2014: Dale Kirby and Christopher Mitchelmore cross the floor to the Liberal Party.
February 28, 2014: Kathy Dunderdale resigns her Virginia Waters seat.
April 9, 2014: Cathy Bennett (Liberal) is elected MHA for Virginia Waters.
April 17, 2014: Frank Coleman becomes leader-designate of the Progressive Conservative Party following the withdrawal of sole competitor Bill Barry from the leadership election.
May 18, 2014: Following a party crisis in October 2013, Lorraine Michael is endorsed by 75% of NDP members during a leadership review.
June 2, 2014: Joan Shea (PC) resigns her St. George's-Stephenville East seat.
June 16, 2014: Citing a "significant and challenging family matter," Frank Coleman announces his withdrawal from the Progressive Conservative leadership race. As the only candidate left in the race, Coleman was to officially become Progressive Conservative leader at the party's convention on July 5, 2014. Following his withdrawal, Premier Tom Marshall announced that a convention would likely be postponed until after Labour Day.
August 26, 2014: Scott Reid (Liberal) is elected MHA for St. George's-Stephenville East.
September 5, 2014: Charlene Johnson (PC) resigns her Trinity-Bay de Verde seat.
September 13, 2014: Paul Davis is elected leader of the Progressive Conservatives.
September 18, 2014: Terry French (PC) resigns his Conception Bay South seat.
September 26, 2014: Paul Davis is sworn in as premier.
November 3, 2014: Tom Marshall (PC) resigns his Humber East seat.
November 5, 2014: Rex Hillier (Liberal) is elected MHA for Conception Bay South.
November 25, 2014: Steve Crocker (Liberal) and Stelman Flynn (Liberal) are elected as MHAs for Trinity-Bay de Verde and Humber East respectively.
2015
January 6, 2015: Lorraine Michael announces she will resign as NDP leader.
March 7, 2015: Earle McCurdy is elected leader of the NDP.
July 3, 2015: Kevin O'Brien (PC) resigns his Gander seat.

Campaign

In June 2015, Premier Davis announced that a general election would be held in November, after the October federal election. Many veteran PC MHAs who had served in Danny Williams' cabinet did not seek re-election. On November 5, Davis visited the lieutenant governor to request that the House of Assembly be dissolved. The election would be held on November 30.

The Liberals consistently held a massive lead in public opinion polling throughout the campaign, with 66 per cent support among decided voters at the outset and 67 per cent support in a poll released just one week before election day.

Their lead was so large and so unshakable that some pundits openly speculated that the party could potentially sweep every seat in the province, although others suggested that this was unlikely. Numerous ridings in and around St. John's remained more competitive than provincewide polling suggested, and some voters appeared to be swayed in the final days by the argument that even if they were inclined to support the Liberals, the province's democratic process would not be well-served by giving one party a clean sweep of the legislature with no opposition party to challenge them.

In the final results, the Liberals did win almost every seat in most of the province, except for a single Progressive Conservative incumbent hanging on in Central Newfoundland; in St. John's, however, the New Democrats successfully retained two of the three seats they held in the city, while the Progressive Conservatives held onto almost every seat in the city's suburbs.

The largest victory in the province was won by Liberal MLA Andrew Parsons in Burgeo-La Poile, who took fully 96.5 per cent of the more than 4,000 votes cast in his riding while neither of his opponents garnered even 100 votes.

Party standings
This election saw the fourth change-in-government since Newfoundland and Labrador joined confederation in 1949.

|- style="background:#ccc;"
! rowspan="2" colspan="2" style="text-align:left;"|Party
! rowspan="2" style="text-align:left;"|Party leader
!rowspan="2"|Candidates
! colspan="4" style="text-align:center;"|Seats
! colspan="3" style="text-align:center;"|Popular vote
|- style="background:#ccc;"
| style="text-align:center;"|2011
| style="text-align:center;"|Dissol.
| style="text-align:center;"|2015
| style="text-align:center;"|Change
| style="text-align:center;"|#
| style="text-align:center;"|%
| style="text-align:center;"|% Change

| style="text-align:left;" |Dwight Ball
| style="text-align:right;" |40
| style="text-align:right;" |6
| style="text-align:right;" |16
| style="text-align:right;" |31
| style="text-align:right;" |15
| style="text-align:right;" |114,271
| style="text-align:right;" |57.2
| style="text-align:right;" |38.1

| style="text-align:left;" |Paul Davis
| style="text-align:right;" |40
| style="text-align:right;" |37
| style="text-align:right;" |29
| style="text-align:right;" |7
| style="text-align:right;" |22
| style="text-align:right;" |60,413
| style="text-align:right;" |30.2
| style="text-align:right;" |25.9

| style="text-align:left;" |Earle McCurdy
| style="text-align:right;" |40
| style="text-align:right;" |5
| style="text-align:right;" |3
| style="text-align:right;" |2
| style="text-align:right;" |1
| style="text-align:right;" |23,906
| style="text-align:right;" |12.0
| style="text-align:right;" |12.6

| style="text-align:left;" colspan="2"|Independents
| style="text-align:right;" |4
| style="text-align:right;" |-
| style="text-align:right;" |-
| style="text-align:right;" |0
| style="text-align:right;" |
| style="text-align:right;" |1,344
| style="text-align:right;" |0.7
| style="text-align:right;" |.5
|-
| style="text-align:left;" colspan="3"|Total
| style="text-align:right;"|111
| style="text-align:right;"|48
| style="text-align:right;"|40
| style="text-align:right;"|40
| style="text-align:right;"|-
| style="text-align:right;"|199,934
| style="text-align:right;"|100%
| style="text-align:right;"| 
|}

Results by party

Liberal Party
The Liberal Party won 31 seats making this election their best election since 1999 when the party won 32. However, in 1990, the party won 32 of 48 seats (66.7%) while in 2015 they won 31 of 40 seats (77.5%). By percentage, this is the party's best result since 1966 when the party won 39 of 42 seats (92.9%). Dwight Ball is the province's first liberal premier since Roger Grimes. 6 liberal candidates won over 80% of the popular vote in their respective ridings and 4 of these 6 candidates were later appointed to the Executive Council.

Progressive Conservative Party
With this election PC leader Paul Davis became the fourth incumbent premier to not lead his party to re-election (after Joey Smallwood in 1972, Tom Rideout in 1989 and Roger Grimes in 2003). With 7 of 40 seats (17.5%), this is the party's worst result since 1966 when it won 3 of 42 seats.

New Democratic Party
In the 2011 election the NDP placed second in total votes and won 5 seats (a record-high for the party) however since the election 2 NDP MHAs defected to the Liberal Party. Only 2 of the 3 remaining NDP MHAs ran for re-election and these 2 MHAs were the only NDP candidates to win in this election. By percentage of seats however, this is the second-best result the provincial NDP has ever had winning 2 of 40 seats (5%). However, NDP leader McCurdy was defeated in his district.

Results by region
The district with the highest turnout was Cape St. Francis (71.68%). The district with the lowest turnout was Torngat Mountains (39.50%).

Candidates by district
Bold incumbents indicates cabinet members and party leaders are italicized. The premier's name is boldfaced and italicized.

All candidate names are those on the official list of confirmed candidates; names in media or on party website may differ slightly.
Names in boldface type represent party leaders.
† represents that the incumbent is not running again.
§ represents that the incumbent was defeated for nomination.
₰ represents that the incumbent ran in another district and lost the nomination
‡ represents that the incumbent is running in a different district.

St. John's

|-
| style="background:whitesmoke;"| Mount Scio46.81% turnout
|
|Rhonda Churchill Herder1,10427.4%
||
|Dale Kirby1,89947.1%
|
|Sean Panting1,03025.5%
|
|
||
|Dale KirbySt. John's North
|-
| style="background:whitesmoke;"| St. John's Centre47.58% turnout
|
|Kathie Hicks49010.6%
|
|Lynn Sullivan1,92341.7%
||
|Gerry Rogers2,19547.6%
|
|
||
|Gerry Rogers
|-
| style="background:whitesmoke;"| St. John's East-Quidi Vidi56.40% turnout
|
|Joshua Collier4788.1%
|
|Paul Antle2,36540.2%
||
|Lorraine Michael3,03551.6%
|
|
||
| George Murphy†St. John's East
|-
| style="background:whitesmoke;"| St. John's West55.63% turnout
|
|Dan Crummell1,36426.8%
||
|Siobhan Coady2,34246.0%
|
|Earle McCurdy1,38427.2%
|
|
||
|Dan Crummell
|-
| style="background:whitesmoke;"| Virginia Waters-Pleasantville56.55% turnout
|
|Beth Crosbie1,82632.5%
||
|Bernard Davis2,52845.0%
|
|Bob Buckingham1,25922.4
|
|
||
| Lorraine Michael‡Signal Hill-Quidi Vidi
|-
|style="background-color:whitesmoke" rowspan=3|Waterford Valley55.13% turnout
|rowspan=3|
|rowspan=3|Alison Stoodley79214.6%
|rowspan=3 |
|rowspan=3| Tom Osborne3,58865.9%
|rowspan=3|
|rowspan=3| Alison Coffin1,06219.5%
|rowspan=3| 
|rowspan=3|
||
|John DinnKilbride
|-
| style="text-align:center;" colspan=2 |Merged District
|-
||
|Tom OsborneSt. John's South
|-
| style="background:whitesmoke;"| Windsor Lake52.59% turnout
|
|Ryan Cleary97020.2%
||
|Cathy Bennett3,18266.3%
|
|Don Rowe64713.5%
|
|
||
|Cathy BennettVirginia Waters
|}

St. John's suburbs

|-
| style="background:whitesmoke;"|Cape St. Francis71.68% turnout
||
|Kevin Parsons4,08666.3%
|
|Geoff Gallant1,61326.2%
|
|Mark Gruchy4607.5%
|
|
||
|Kevin Parsons

|-
| style="background:whitesmoke;"|Conception Bay South55.03% turnout
||
|Barry Petten2,36047.7%
|
|Steve Porter2,18744.2%
|
|Jeanne Clarke3988.0%
|
|
||
|Rex Hillier‡
|-
| style="background:whitesmoke;"|Mount Pearl North63.09% turnout
||
|Steve Kent3,12051.5%
|
|Randy Simms2,57142.4%
|
|Cameron Mercer-Maillet3706.1%
|
|
||
|Steve Kent
|-
| style="background:whitesmoke;"|Mount Pearl-Southlands56.58% turnout
|
|Jim Lester2,31842.9%
||
|Paul Lane2,55947.4%
|
|Roy Locke5229.7%
|
|
||
|Paul LaneMount Pearl South
|-

| style="background:whitesmoke;"| Conception Bay East – Bell Island55.46% turnout
||
|David Brazil3,46359.2%
|
|Danny Dumaresque1,58227.1%
|
|Bill Kavanagh80313.7%
|
|
||
|David Brazil
|-

| style="background:whitesmoke;"| Topsail-Paradise57.58% turnout 
||
|Paul Davis3,38158.3%
|
|Rex Hillier2,13736.9%
|
|Chris Bruce2814.8%
|
|
||
|Paul Davis Topsail
|}

Avalon Peninsula

|-
|style="background-color:whitesmoke" rowspan=3|Carbonear-Trinity-Bay de Verde49.02% turnout
|rowspan=3|
|rowspan=3|Tomas Shea5299.1%
|rowspan=3 |
|rowspan=3|Steve Crocker4,95285.0%
|rowspan=3|
|rowspan=3|David Coish3045.2%
|rowspan=3|
|rowspan=3|Ed Cole (Ind.)380.7%
||
|Steve CrockerTrinity-Bay de Verde
|-
| style="text-align:center;" colspan=2 |Merged District
|-
||
|Sam Slade§Carbonear-Harbour Grace
|-
| style="background:whitesmoke;"|Ferryland62.34% turnout
||
|Keith Hutchings3,09349.8%
|
|Jeff Marshall2,55041.1%
|
|Mona Rossiter5649.1%
|
|
||
|Keith Hutchings
|-
| style="background:whitesmoke;"| Harbour Grace-Port de Grave59.50% turnout
|
|Glenn Littlejohn2,28936.3%
||
|Pam Parsons3,87761.5%
|
|Kathleen Burt1332.1%
|
|
||
|Glenn Littlejohn Port de Grave
|-
| style="background:whitesmoke;"|Harbour Main56.31% turnout
|
|Curtis Buckle1,99834.9%
||
|Betty Parsley2,25339.4%
|
|Raymond Flaherty1,38124.2%
|
|Ted Noseworthy 851.5%
||
|Tom Hedderson†
|-
| style="background:whitesmoke;"|Placentia-St. Mary's61.71% turnout
|
|Judy Manning1,75130.5%
||
|Sherry Gambin-Walsh3,78966.0%
|
|Peter Beck1973.4%
|
|
||
|Felix Collins†
|}

Eastern Newfoundland

|-
| style="background:whitesmoke;"|Bonavista57.80% turnout
|
|Glen Little1,43627.0%
||
|Neil King3,50465.8%
|
|Adrian Power1162.2%
|
|Johanna Ryan Guy (Ind.)2695.1%
||
|Glen LittleBonavista South
|-
| style="background:whitesmoke;"| Burin-Grand Bank53.60% turnout
|
|Terence Fleming4418.8%
||
|Carol Anne Haley3,96279.4%
|
|Ambrose Penton59011.8%
|
|
||
|Darin King† Grand Bank
|-
|style="background-color:whitesmoke" rowspan=3|Placentia West-Bellevue59.10% turnout
|rowspan=3|
|rowspan=3|Calvin Peach1,93133.7%
|rowspan=3 |
|rowspan=3|Mark Browne3,64563.7%
|rowspan=3|
|rowspan=3|Bobbie Warren1462.6%
|rowspan=3|
|rowspan=3|
||
|Calvin PeachBellevue
|-
| style="text-align:center;" colspan=2 |Merged District
|-
||
|Clyde Jackman†Burin-Placentia West
|-
|style="background-color:whitesmoke" rowspan=3|Terra Nova57.29% turnout
|rowspan=3|
|rowspan=3|Sandy Collins2,42242.8%
|rowspan=3 |
|rowspan=3|Colin Holloway2,47643.7%
|rowspan=3|
|rowspan=3|Bert Blundon76313.5
|rowspan=3|
|rowspan=3|
||
|Sandy CollinsTerra Nova
|-
| style="text-align:center;" colspan=2 |Merged District
|-
||
|Ross Wiseman†Trinity North
|}

Central Newfoundland

|-
| style="background:whitesmoke;"| Baie Verte-Green Bay55.90% turnout
|
|Kevin Pollard2,19739.4%
||
|Brian Warr3,13056.1%
|
|Matt Howse2534.5%
|
|
||
|Kevin PollardBaie Verte-Springdale
|-
| style="background:whitesmoke;"|Exploits56.16% turnout
|
|Clayton Forsey2,48947.0%
||
|Jerry Dean2,65450.2%
|
|Bridget Henley1482.8%
|
|
||
|Clayton Forsey
|-
| style="background:whitesmoke;"|Fogo Island-Cape Freels48.20% turnout
|
|Eli Cross1,38727.6%
|| 
|Derrick Bragg3,51669.9%
|
|Rebecca Stuckey1282.5%
|
|
||
|Eli CrossBonavista North
|-
| style="background:whitesmoke;"|Gander47.40% turnout
|
|Ryan Menchion3517.5%
||
|John Haggie3,15167.7%
|
|Lukas Norman1,15224.8%
|
|
|
|Vacant
|-
| style="background:whitesmoke;"|Fortune Bay-Cape La Hune67.66% turnout
||
|Tracey Perry1,83049.1%
|
|Bill Carter1,40537.7%
|
|Mildred Skinner49413.2%
|
|
||
|Tracey Perry
|-
|style="background-color:whitesmoke" rowspan=3|Grand Falls-Windsor-Buchans54.32% turnout
|rowspan=3|
|rowspan=3|Mark Whiffen1,06122.8%
|rowspan=3 |
|rowspan=3|Al Hawkins2,53454.6%
|rowspan=3|
|rowspan=3|Meaghan Keating1413.0%
|rowspan=3|
|rowspan=3|Rex Barnes (Ind.)90819.6%
||
|Susan Sullivan†Grand Falls-Windsor-Buchans
|-
| style="text-align:center;" colspan=2 |Merged District
|-
||
|Ray Hunter†Grand Falls-Windsor-Green Bay South
|-
|style="background-color:whitesmoke" rowspan=3|Lewisporte-Twillingate58.44% turnout
|rowspan=3|
|rowspan=3|Derrick Dalley2,68644.5%
|rowspan=3 |
|rowspan=3|Derek Bennett3,25453.9%
|rowspan=3|
|rowspan=3|Hillary Bushell991.6%
|rowspan=3|
|rowspan=3|
||
|Wade Verge†Lewisporte
|-
| style="text-align:center;" colspan=2 |Merged District
|-
||
|Derrick DalleyThe Isles of Notre Dame
|}

Western Newfoundland

|-
| style="background:whitesmoke;"|Burgeo-La Poile57.73% turnout
|
|Georgia Darmonkow932.2%
||
|Andrew Parsons3,99896.5%
|
|Kelly McKeown531.3%
|
|
||
|Andrew Parsons
|-
|style="background-color:whitesmoke" rowspan=3|Corner Brook45.03% turnout
|rowspan=3|
|rowspan=3|Neville Wheaton77916.6%
|rowspan=3 |
|rowspan=3|Gerry Byrne3,12166.7%
|rowspan=3|
|rowspan=3|Holly Pike78116.7%
|rowspan=3|
|rowspan=3|
||
|Vaughn GranterHumber West
|-
| style="text-align:center;" colspan=2 |Merged District
|-
||
|Stelman Flynn§Humber East
|-
|style="background-color:whitesmoke" rowspan=3|Humber - Gros Morne64.85% turnout
|rowspan=3|
|rowspan=3|Graydon Pelley98316.2%
|rowspan=3 |
|rowspan=3|Dwight Ball4,61076.0%
|rowspan=3|
|rowspan=3|Mike Goosney4747.8%
|rowspan=3|
|rowspan=3|
||
|Jim Bennett₰St. Barbe
|-
| style="text-align:center;" colspan=2 |Merged District
|-
||
|Dwight BallHumber Valley
|-
| style="background:whitesmoke;"|Humber-Bay of Islands52.56% turnout
|
|Ronald Jesseau56410.3%
||
|Eddie Joyce4,62284.5%
|
|Conor Curtis2825.2%
|
|
||
|Eddie JoyceBay of Islands
|-
| style="background:whitesmoke;"| St. Barbe-L'Anse aux Meadows52.65% turnout
|
|Ford Mitchelmore4048.3%
||
|Chris Mitchelmore4,35989.3%
|
|Genevieve Brouillette1172.4%
|
|
||
|Chris MitchelmoreThe Straits-White Bay North
|-
|style="background:whitesmoke;"|St. George's-Humber49.68% turnout
|
|Greg Osmond70815.2%
||
|Scott Reid3,61877.5%
|
|Shane Snook3417.3%
|
|
||
|Scott ReidSt. George's-Stephenville East
|-
| style="background:whitesmoke;"|Stephenville-Port au Port51.24% turnout
|
|Tony Cornect1,27325.3%
||
|John Finn3,26264.8%
|
|Bernice Hancock4999.9%
|
|
||
|Tony CornectPort au Port
|}

Labrador

|-
| style="background:whitesmoke;"|Cartwright-L'Anse au Clair49.30% turnout
|
|Jason MacKenzie483.2%
||
|Lisa Dempster1,40593.0%
|
|Jennifer Deon573.8%
|
|
||
|Lisa Dempster
|-
| style="background:whitesmoke;"|Labrador West53.60% turnout
|
|Nick McGrath71221.5%
||
|Graham Letto1,45343.8%
|
|Ron Barron1,15234.7%
|
|
||
|Nick McGrath
|-
| style="background:whitesmoke;"|Lake Melville47.97% turnout
|
|Keith Russell85028.6%
||
|Perry Trimper1,84062.0%
|
|Arlene Michelin-Pittman2809.4%
|
|
||
|Keith Russell (politician)|Keith Russell
|-
| style="background:whitesmoke;"|Torngat Mountains39.50% turnout
|
|Sharon Vokey232.7%
||
|Randy Edmunds77992.6%
|
|Mark Sharkey394.6%
|
|
||
|Randy Edmunds
|}

Preliminary results as of 1 December 2015.

MHAs not running again

Progressive Conservative
 Felix Collins, Placentia—St. Mary's
 John Dinn, Kilbride
Vaughn Granter, Humber West
Tom Hedderson, Harbour Main
 Ray Hunter, Grand Falls-Windsor-Green Bay South
Clyde Jackman, Burin-Placentia West   
Darin King, Grand Bank  
Susan Sullivan, Grand Falls-Windsor-Buchans  
 Wade Verge, Lewisporte
 Ross Wiseman, Trinity North

Liberal
Jim Bennett, St. Barbe
Stelman Flynn, Humber East  
Sam Slade, Carbonear-Harbour Grace

New Democratic Party
George Murphy, St. John's East

Opinion polls

References

Newfoundland and Labrador general election
2015
General election
Newfoundland and Labrador general election